Skeleton Tree is the sixteenth studio album by Australian rock band Nick Cave and the Bad Seeds. It was released on 9 September 2016 on Bad Seed Ltd. A follow-up to the band's critically acclaimed album Push the Sky Away (2013), Skeleton Tree was recorded over 18 months at Retreat Recording Studios in Brighton, La Frette Studios in La Frette-sur-Seine and Air Studios in London. It was produced by Nick Cave, Warren Ellis and Nick Launay. During the sessions, Cave's 15-year-old son, Arthur, died from an accidental fall. Most of the album had been written at the time of Cave's son's death, but several lyrics were amended by Cave during subsequent recording sessions and feature themes of death, loss, and personal grief.

Skeleton Trees minimal production and "less polished" sound incorporates elements of electronica and ambient music and, like Push the Sky Away, features extensive use of synthesizers, drum machines and loops. Several songs on the album utilise avant-garde techniques, including the use of dissonant musical elements and non-standard song structures. Cave's allegorical and often-improvised lyrics have also been noted to be less narrative and character-based than on previous Bad Seeds albums.

One More Time with Feeling, a documentary film about the aftermath of Cave's son's death and the recording process of Skeleton Tree, accompanied the album's release. Directed by Andrew Dominik, the film received a limited release and was conceived by Cave to explain the context and themes of Skeleton Tree without conducting interviews with the media. Both the film and the album received widespread critical acclaim.

Recording
Skeleton Tree was recorded over several sessions from late 2014 to early 2016, with Nick Cave and Warren Ellis producing the album; Cave financed the recording sessions himself. Initial recording began at Retreat Recording Studios in Brighton, England, in late 2014, with Kevin Paul as the main recording engineer. On July 15, 2015, near the end of the sessions, Cave's 15-year-old son Arthur died after falling from the nearby Ovingdean Gap. Cave and Ellis returned to the studio two weeks later to review the material recorded for Skeleton Tree. Most of the basic tracks for each song and a majority of Cave's vocals were completed by this time. The album's sessions then resumed at La Frette Studios in La Frette-sur-Seine, France, in autumn 2015, with Nick Launay engineering and co-producing the sessions. Final overdubs for Skeleton Tree were recorded at Air Studios in London, with engineers Kevin Paul and Jake Jackson, in early 2016. Several performances from the final recording sessions were shot for the album's accompanying documentary film One More Time with Feeling, directed by Andrew Dominik.

Composition
Several publications have noted Skeleton Trees lyrical themes of loss and death, particularly in relation to the death of Cave's son Arthur. The majority of the songs on the album were written prior to Arthur's death. However, some lyrics—such as the opening lines to "Jesus Alone"—have been regarded as "prophetic" in the wake of his death. Several lyrics were "semi-improvised" in subsequent recording sessions as Cave had expressed a desire to move on from "narrative-based songs", claiming he had "lost faith" in them.

Skeleton Trees lyrics are noted as being often allegorical and "never directly [address]" the event of Arthur's death. Esquire observed how the album's lyrics are "less explicitly about Arthur's death and more about the ripple effects of that sort of catastrophe" on Cave and his family, "and the way everyone else finds their way back"; Billboard described the album's lyrics as "freeform elegies … tapping into the unconscious." Consequence of Sound detailed the "radical shift" in Cave's lyrics on Skeleton Tree, noting that they "[are] no longer telling elaborate stories full of intricately felt characters" like the Bad Seeds' previous material and that Cave had "unlock[ed] a more primal type of storytelling, something even more raw, deep, and dark". Cave commissioned Andrew Dominik to direct One More Time with Feeling—in which Cave discusses the album's writing and recording process after Arthur's death—so that he could address the album's context without conducting interviews with the media.

Skeleton Trees sound has been observed as "far more stripped-down" than the Bad Seeds' earlier albums and features "less polished" production. The album features components of multiple genres and has been described generally as an avant-garde album. Several songs contain dissonant musical elements—including the use of unresolved chords, drones, atonality, noise, and vocal melodies which do not conform to the songs' time signatures. Additionally, most of the songs' structures do not follow the standard verse-chorus-verse form. Skeleton Tree has been also described as featuring elements of electronica—including use of synthesizers, drum machines and shuffled beats. The album's "sparse and restrained" arrangements, as well as its use of loops and downtempo rhythms, have been cited by several critics as reminiscent of ambient music.

Packaging
Skeleton Trees sleeve design was created by the Hingston Studio, an independent creative agency based in London; Tom Hingston, the agency's creative director, had previously designed the sleeve and cover art for Push the Sky Away. The front-cover artwork features a solid black background, with the band name and album title in monospace-style green font in the bottom-left centre. Skeleton Trees interior liner notes, as well as the text on the discs, are presented in the same typeface. A black-and-white photograph of Cave from the album's recording sessions, depicting him writing in a notebook while seated at a grand piano, is featured in the booklet; it was shot by German cinematographer and photographer Alwin Küchler.

Several publications have commented on the minimalist design of Skeleton Tree, regarding it as a visual equivalent to the album's themes. Néoprisme, a French design magazine, described the choice use of black as "the colour of eternal mourning" and reminiscent of how the album was "stained black due to the circumstance." Paste referred to Skeleton Trees cover art as "stark" and "up front … leaving little to the imagination" and said it symbolised Cave "mak[ing] it plain to listeners that he's still mourning".

Release

Skeleton Tree was released worldwide on 9 September 2016 on Bad Seed Ltd,
under licence to Kobalt Label Services. It was issued on CD, LP and across all digital 
streaming and download platforms. The album was announced three months before its release, and a one-and-a-half-minute trailer for both Skeleton Tree and Andrew Dominik's documentary film One More Time with Feeling was released in August. The album's track listing was confirmed two weeks later.

A week prior to Skeleton Trees release the opening track from the album, "Jesus Alone", was released as a single. A music video directed by Dominik accompanied the release and featured footage from One More Time with Feeling. A second video from One More Time with Feeling, featuring the Nick Cave and the Bad Seeds performing "I Need You", was released a week later.

One More Time with Feeling—featuring in-studio performances by the band and "accompanied by Cave's intermittent narration and improvised rumination"—was shot in both black and white and colour and in both 2D and 3D. The film was released in cinemas worldwide on 8 September, the day before Skeleton Trees official release. Originally a one-night-only event, additional screenings were added until 11 September due to demand in certain locations. Critical response to One More Time with Feeling was unanimously positive.

Commercial performance
On the United Kingdom's mid-week albums chart Skeleton Tree debuted at number 2, selling 17,600 copies in its first three days of release.

Skeleton Tree debuted at number one on the Australian Albums Chart as well as on several international albums charts, including the Belgian Albums Chart in Wallonia, the Danish Albums Chart, the Finnish Albums Chart, the Irish Albums Chart, the Irish Independent Albums Chart, the New Zealand Albums Chart, and the Norwegian Albums Chart.

Skeleton Tree became Nick Cave's highest charting album in the United States, debuting at number twenty-seven on the Billboard 200.

Reception

Critical response

Upon its release Skeleton Tree received rave reviews from music critics and audiences. At Metacritic, which assigns a normalised rating out of 100 to reviews from mainstream critics, the album received an average score of 95, based on 34 reviews, indicating "universal acclaim." In a five-out-of-five-star review for the London Evening Standard, John Aizlewood called Skeleton Tree a "breathtakingly beautiful, grief-strewn record, sometimes direct, sometimes allegorical" and praised both the album's "tender and restrained" music and Cave's "more broken and more uncertain" vocals; Aizlewood said that Skeleton Tree was a "staggering achievement, the one for which Nick Cave will always be remembered." An early first-listen review in the Guardian referred to the album as "unsurprisingly, a very dark record", but said "there is also beauty, empathy and love as it veers between bewildered numbness and heartbreaking profundity". The Guardians Dave Simpson likened Cave's "instinctive howl from the heart and gut" to Johnny Cashs cover version of Nine Inch Nails "Hurt", saying "the frailties, wounds and vulnerabilities in his voice give the record its strength and humanity" and summarising it as "a masterpiece of love and devastation".

In a first listen review, Jess Denham of The Independent wrote that Cave's "experience of bereavement is blisteringly undiluted" and called Skeleton Tree "a beautiful, shatteringly visceral portrait of grief". Writing for Rolling Stone, reviewer Kory Grow referred to Cave as "the dean of literary gothic song-craft, a master of wordplay, symbolism and irony" and described how on Skeleton Tree Cave was "baring his soul like never before", adding that the album "resonates with raw, emotional intensity in a stunning way". NME reviewer Barry Nicolson called it a "masterpiece" and "both beautiful and harrowing, hard to listen to but even harder to look away from." In a review for AllMusic, Mark Deming was more reserved in his praise, noting that "the music lacks the dramatic, grand-scale arrangements of Cave's albums of the 21st century" and that "the final effect feels more like an author reading over ambient backing tracks than the sort of evocative sounds one might expect" from the band, but nonetheless concluding that although Skeleton Tree is a "tough listen … it's also a powerful and revealing one, and a singular work from a one-of-a-kind artist."

Slant Magazine writer Jeremy Winograd called Skeleton Tree "Cave's darkest, most emotionally devastating work to date" and said that although it "may not be Cave's most accessible album, owing both to the experimental nature of much of the music and the fact that its level of emotional rawness makes it a legitimately uncomfortable listen in places, it may very well be his best"; Wingrod rated the album four-and-a-half-out-of-five stars. Clash gave Skeleton Tree a nine-out-of-ten rating, with reviewer Josh Gray praising Cave and Ellis' songwriting and arrangements and summarising the album as "a stark, beautiful rendering of deep, profound pain." Paula Mejia wrote in Paste that "Skeleton Tree strips down embellishments and brings to the forefront sinister bass lines and a synthesizer that will widen the tear in your heart a little more with every note"; Mejia concluded that "there's something to be said about Skeleton Tree and its starkness, which is as familiar as life and death, an elegy, and a hell of a thing to forget", rating the album nine out of ten. Pitchfork also gave the album a nine-out-of-ten rating and selected it as the week's "Best New Music"; "I Need You" was also selected as the week's "Best New Track" and was described as "the stirring core of the Bad Seeds' devastating new album."

Accolades

Track listing

Personnel
All personnel credits adapted from Skeleton Trees album notes.

Nick Cave and the Bad Seeds
Nick Cave – vocals, piano, Wurlitzer, synthesizer, vibraphone, backing vocals
Warren Ellis – synthesizer, loops, Wurlitzer, piano, baritone tenor guitar, violin, viola, drum treatments, drum loops, backing vocals
Martyn Casey – bass
Thomas Wydler – drums
Jim Sclavunos – percussion, vibraphone, tubular bells, backing vocals
George Vjestica – acoustic guitar, backing vocals

Additional musicians
Else Torp – additional vocals 
Ellie Wyatt – violin
Charlotte Glason – viola
Joe Giddey – cello

Technical personnel
Kevin Paul – recording, additional overdubs, mixing
Nick Launay – recording
Jake Jackson – additional overdubs, mixing
Nick Cave – mixing
Warren Ellis – mixing
Jim Sclavunos – mixing
Chris Blakey – mixing assistance
Nicolas Quéré – mixing assistance
Arnaud Bequet – mixing assistance
Jonathan Ratovoarisoa – mixing assistance
John Prestage – mixing assistance
John Davis – mastering

Artwork
Hingston Studio – design
Alwin Küchler – photography

Charts

Weekly charts

Year-end charts

Certifications

Notes

References

External links

2016 albums
Albums produced by Nick Launay
Ambient albums by Australian artists
Bad Seed Ltd albums
Experimental rock albums by Australian artists
Nick Cave albums
Self-released albums